Joan Barreda Bort (born 11 August 1983 in Castellón de la Plana) is a Spanish rally raid motorcycle rider, best known for his participation in the Dakar Rally.

Career
Barreda Bort made his Dakar debut in 2011, riding an Aprilia, but was forced to retire during the second stage of the event due to a fall. Switching to Husqvarna machinery for 2012, Barreda Bort had a promising start - finishing third during the second stage of the rally - before losing significant time to mechanical problems. Nonetheless, he continued to show strong pace for the remainder of the rally, winning the tenth stage, and ultimately finished in 11th overall, three hours and 37 minutes down on the winning time of Cyril Despres. Later that year, Barreda Bort won the motorcycle category of the Egyptian-based Pharaons Rally for Husqvarna, winning the first, third and fourth stages. In addition, Barreda Bort won the Spanish Baja, once again aboard a Husqvarna.

Continuing with Husqvarna for 2013, Barreda Bort took the lead of the overall classification with victory in the second stage. However, navigation problems in the third stage and fuel pump problems in the fifth stage  restricted him to 17th place overall, in spite of three additional victories in the fourth, eighth and tenth stages of the rally. His time was just over three hours shy of that of the winner, Despres.

In 2014, Barreda led early on after winning two of the first three stages, only to drop back behind Marc Coma after navigation problems on stages four and five. He was on course to finish a comfortable second to Coma before suffering electrical failure on the penultimate stage, relegating him to seventh place at the finish despite taking the most stage wins of anybody (five). The same year, Barreda contested four rounds of the FIM Cross-Country Rallies championship, winning the Qatar-based Sealine Rally en route to finishing third in that year's standings.

In the following years, Barreda became one of the favourites to win the Dakar Rally in bikes, specially after the retirement of Marc Coma and Cyril Despres from such category. After touching the podium on several occasions, Barreda arrived to the 2017 Dakar Rally with high hopes after a good year of preparation. When he was leading the category by more than 12 minutes after the 3 first stages, Barreda was penalized with one hour for refueling in an illegal zone. Barreda finished in 5th place and 43 minutes behind the winner.

Barreda finished 7th overall in 2020 Dakar Rally.

In 2021 Dakar Rally, Barreda equaled Jordi Arcarons as the third rider with the most stages won in the bike category, with a total of 27.

Joan finished the 2022 Dakar Rally in 5th place. After losing about 40 minutes in the first leg of the rally, Barreda tried to close the gap for the following days. With a win in the second stage, and another one in the forth, Barreda became as the third bike rider with most stages won. Despite falling in stage five and getting heavily injured, Barreda was fighting for the final podium until the last days of the race, finally finishing in the top 5.

Dakar Rally results

Other results

FIM Cross-Country Rallies World Championship results

FIM Bajas World Cup results

Rally raid best results (Motorbikes)

References

Dakar Rally motorcyclists
1983 births
Living people
Spanish motorcycle racers
Off-road motorcycle racers
Sportspeople from Castellón de la Plana